Dmitri Sergeyevich Kiselev (born 10 August 1989) is a Russian ice dancer. Competing with Ekaterina Pushkash for Russia, he placed 6th at the 2009 World Junior Championships. He later competed with Gabriela Kubová for the Czech Republic, placing 18th at the 2012 European Championships.

Career 
In 2000, Kiselev teamed up with his maternal first cousin, Ekaterina Pushkash. They moved from Nizhny Novgorod to Moscow for training in 2002. Pushkash/Kiselev won silver medals at the 2008–2009 ISU Junior Grand Prix event in Gomel, Belarus and at the 2009 Russian Junior Championships. They finished sixth at the 2009 World Junior Championships and parted ways at the end of the season.

In 2009, Kiselev teamed up with Gabriela Kubová to compete for the Czech Republic. In their first two seasons together, they competed on the junior level and placed 14th at the 2010 World Junior Championships. Moving up to the senior level in the 2011–12 season, Kubová/Kiselev won the silver medal at the Pavel Roman Memorial and gold at the Czech national championships. They were assigned to the 2012 European Championships, placing 18th, and to the 2012 World Championships, placing 26th. Kiselev retired from competition in autumn 2012.

Sanctions 
In January 2023 Ukraine imposed sanctions on Dmitri Kiselev for promoting Russia during the 2022 Russian invasion of Ukraine.

Programs

With Kubová

With Pushkash

Competitive highlights

With Kubová for the Czech Republic

With Pushkash for Russia

References

External links 

 
 

Russian male ice dancers
Czech male ice dancers
1989 births
Living people
People from Nizhny Novgorod Oblast